A Kindness Cup (1974) is a novel by Australian author Thea Astley.  It won the 1975 The Age Book of the Year Award.

Plot summary

The novel is set in a cane-country town on the north Queensland coast.  It deals with a wave of racist brutality in the 1860s and the attempts, some twenty or so years later, to rectify the wrongs caused.

Reviews

Malcolm Pettigrove in The Canberra Times was not overly impressed with the book stating: "When Miss Astley drops the prose of the stylist and begins to function simply as a writer with a tale to tell her work becomes stark, tense, and most effectively dramatic." 

Kate Grenville reread the book in 2018, upon it being reissued. She called Astley "ahead of her time" and that "Thirty years beforehand she had known what some of us were only just waking up to: that our own history provides a powerful engine for fiction, and that the voice of fiction can say the unspoken about that history." Steve Walker, of Stuff wrote "Astley's work is characterised by her irony and her unflinching scrutiny of social injustice. In A Kindness Cup, she was at the top of her impressive form."

References

1974 Australian novels
Novels by Thea Astley
Novels set in Queensland